Hillsborough is an unincorporated community in Albert County in the province of New Brunswick, Canada. It held village status prior to 2023. Hillsborough is on a hill overlooking the Petitcodiac River near the intersection of Route 910 and Route 114. It is the largest settlement in Hillsborough Parish.

History

Originally established around 1700 as "Blanchard's Village" by Acadian farmers, they lived here for sixty years, building dykes that are still in use. Before the Great Expulsion of the Acadians in 1755, the area was almost 100% French. Now, few Acadians live there, though there are several Acadian settlements on the opposite bank of the Petitcodiac River, such as Pre d'en Haut, New Brunswick.

On September 4, 1755, the Battle of Petitcodiac was fought near Hillsborough. After the capture of Fort Beausejour during the Seven Years' War, in an attempt to gain control over the region, the British sent a punitive expedition consisting of two companies of British colonial troops into the Petitcodiac River Valley to destroy the Acadian settlements located there. While the main body finished their operation on the eastern bank, a detachment was dispatched to the western bank. When the detachment under Major Joseph Frye approached Blanchard's Village, located near where Hillsborough now stands, it encountered French forces under the command of Captain Charles Deschamps de Boishébert and was driven off with heavy losses. The site is marked by a National Historic Sites and Monument plaque.

In 1766, a group of settlers arrived in the area led by Matthias Somers, Michael Lutz, Jacob Trietz (Trites), Charles Jones, and Heinrich Stieff (Steeves). Heinrich Steeves had seven sons and the name Steeves is still common among residents.

On 1 January 2023, Hillsborough amalgamated with the villages of Alma and Riverside-Albert and parts of five local service districts to form the new village of Fundy Albert. The community's name remains in official use.

Demographics 

Places of note

Hillsborough is home to the Albert County Chamber of Commerce and the historic New Brunswick Railway Museum and the Hon. William Henry Steeves House Museum.
Grays Island is a cemetery.
Surrey was amalgamated into Hillsborough.

Education
Caledonia Regional High School
Hillsborough Elementary School

Notable people

William Steeves, one of the Fathers of Confederation
Hugh McMonagle
William James Lewis
Neil McNeil, former Catholic archbishop of Toronto, was a native of Hillsborough.
 Burpee L. Steeves Lieutenant Governor of Idaho

See also
List of communities in New Brunswick

References

External links

Village of Hillsborough

Communities in Albert County, New Brunswick
Former villages in New Brunswick
Communities in Greater Moncton
Mining communities in New Brunswick